The following is a list of articles about recurring themes in science fiction.

Overarching themes

First contact with aliens
Artificial intelligence
Machine rule/Cybernetic revolt/AI takeover
Extraterrestrials in fiction
End of humanity: Apocalyptic and post-apocalyptic fiction
The future
Apocalyptic and post-apocalyptic fiction: Apocalypses or worldwide disasters and new societies that develop after the event
History
Alternate history
Scientific prediction of the future (e.g. psychohistory)
Human fears: List of science fiction horror films
Language
Alien languages (e.g. Klingon, Huttese)
The Sapir–Whorf Hypothesis (e.g. Babel 17, The Languages of Pao)
Universal translators (e.g. Babel fish)
Military/conflicts
Interstellar war
Weapons in science fiction
Parallel worlds or multiverse

Philosophies and philosophical ideas
Political ideas 
Religious ideas
Sex and sexuality
LGBT themes
Gender
Reproduction and pregnancy
Simulated reality and consciousness
Social science fiction
Technological singularity
Themes of fantasy fiction

Beings and entities
Artificial intelligences
Androids and Gynoid
Artificial life
Biological robot
Cyborgs
Robots and humanoid robots
Replicants
Simulated consciousness
Characters
The Absent-minded professor 
The Golem
The Mad Scientist
Redshirt
Space Pirate
Super Soldier
Clones
Dinosaurs
Extraterrestrial life
Hypothetical types of biochemistry
Alien invasion
Astrobiology
God-like aliens
Principles of non-interference (e.g. Prime Directive)
Message from space
Living planets (both sentient and non-sentient)
Hive minds
Infomorphs—memories, characters, and consciences of persons being uploaded to a computer or storage media
Mutants
Shapeshifters
Superhumans
Superorganisms
Symbionts
UFOs
Uplifting—using technology to "raise" non-human animals to human evolutionary levels
Ancient astronauts
Progressor

Body and mind alterations
Biohacking/Amateur biotechnicians
Artificial organs
Additional or improved senses
X-ray vision
Cloning
Exocortex
Genetic engineering
Super race
Intelligence amplification
Invisibility
Life extension, Biological immortality, Universal immortalism and immortality
Cryonics
Digital immortality
Mind uploading
Organ transplantation
Organlegging
Prosthetics
Memory
Memory erasure/editing
Memory sharing
Group mind
Mind control
Mind swap
Mind uploading
Neural implants to directly interface with machinery
Psi powers and psychic phenomena
Clairvoyance
Precognition
Pyrokinesis
Retrocognition
Telepathy
Telekinesis
Parasitism
Psychedelia
Resizing (size-changing, miniaturization, magnification, shrinking, and enlargement)
Shapeshifting
Superhuman strength
Teleportation
Transhumanism and Posthumanism

Habitats
Artificial worlds
Alien Zoo—a zoo where humans are kept as exhibits
Arcologies—enormous habitats (hyperstructures) of extremely high human population density
Cyberspace—the new, virtual territory of societal interaction
Domed city
Floating city
Future of the Earth
Climate change—science fiction dealing with effects of anthropogenic climate change and global warming at the end of the Holocene era
Megacity
Seasteading and ocean colonization
Pirate utopia
Reality Television
Space colonization
Colonization of the Moon
Pantropy
Other planets
Desert planet
Mars
Terraformed planets
Space stations and habitats
Underground city

Political themes

Adhocracy
Anarcho-capitalism
Capitalism
Evil corporation
Megacorporation
Neo-feudalism
Cognitive liberty
Dystopias and utopias
Environmental pollution
Overpopulation
Technological utopianism
Totalitarianism
Galactic empires
Government by algorithm
Legal personality
Libertarianism
Mass surveillance
Mind reading and mind control
National security state
Post-scarcity economy
Socialism
Nanosocialism
Technoethics
Bioethics
Technophobia
Techno-progressivism
Terrorism
Bio-terrorism
Eco-terrorism
Totalitarianism vs. Libertarianism

Technologies

Artificial gravity
Artificial intelligence
Asteroid mining
Astronomical engineering
Brain–computer interface
Cloaking device
Emerging technologies
Robots
Self-replicating machines
Simulated reality
Star lifting and stellar engineering
Stasis device
Total conversion as energy source
Mecha
Megascale engineering and planetary engineering
Megastructures
Dyson sphere
Molecular manufacturing and Nanotechnology
Molecular assembler
Alien technology
Virtual reality, mixed reality, augmented reality
Infosphere
Metaverse
Weapons in science fiction

Travel
Accidental travel
Colonization of other planets, moons, asteroids, etc.
Embryo space colonization
Generation ship
Interstellar ark
Uploaded astronaut
Terraforming
Space exploration
Interstellar travel/Starships
Faster-than-light travel and communications
Hyperspace
Slipstream
Warp drives
Wormholes
Ansibles
Close to light speed
Bussard ramjets
Ursula K. Le Guin's NAFAL ships, and the Twin paradox
Much slower than light
Generation ship
Sleeper ship
Space stations
Teleportation
Teletransporter
Time travel
Alternate history: time travel can be used as a plot device to explore parallel universes. While alternate history has its own category (see above), it often occurs in time travel stories as well.
Alternate future
Time loop
Travel to the Earth's center
Hollow Earth

See also

 Biology in fiction
 Fantasy tropes
 Outline of science fiction
 Protoscience

References

Science fiction themes